The Libera Award for Best Classical Record (known as Best Classical Album prior to 2021) is an award presented by the American Association of Independent Music at the annual Libera Award which recognizes "best classical music album released commercially in the United States by an independent label" since 2018.

Winners and nominees

Artists that received multiple nominations
2 nominations
Grandbrothers
Niklas Paschburg
Vitamin String Quartet

References

Libera Awards